Dame Julia Myra Hess,  (25 February 1890 – 25 November 1965) was an English pianist best known for her performances of the works of Bach, Mozart, Beethoven and Schumann.

Career

Early life 
Julia Myra Hess was born on 25 February 1890 to a Jewish family in South Hampstead, London. She was the youngest of four children and began piano lessons at the age of five. She studied at the Guildhall School of Music and at the Royal Academy of Music under Tobias Matthay.

Her debut came in 1907, when she played Beethoven's Piano Concerto No. 4 with Sir Thomas Beecham conducting. She went on to tour through Britain, the Netherlands and France. Upon her American debut in New York City on 24 January 1922, she became a favorite in the United States, both as a soloist and ensemble player.

Second World War 
Hess garnered greater fame during the Second World War when, with all concert halls blacked out at night to avoid being targeted by German bombers, she organised almost 2,000 lunchtime concerts, starting during The Blitz. The concerts were held at the National Gallery, in Trafalgar Square. Hess began her lunchtime concerts a few weeks after the start of the war. They were presented on Monday to Friday, for six-and-a-half years without fail. If London was being bombed, the concert was moved to a smaller, safer room. Promising young performers (such as Eiluned Davies, who gave the UK premiere of Shostakovich's Piano Sonata, Op. 12 at the Gallery on 31 May 1943) were given the opportunity to appear in the concerts alongside established musicians, initially for no fee but after a while all the performers received a standard 'expense fee' of five guineas, no matter who they were, with the exception of Hess herself, who never took a fee for her appearances in the series.

In all, Hess presented 1,698 concerts seen by 824,152 people; she personally played in 150 of them. She made a brief appearance performing at one of her lunchtime concerts in the 1942 wartime documentary Listen to Britain (directed by Humphrey Jennings and Stewart McAllister), a performance enjoyed by the Queen in the audience.

For this contribution to maintaining the morale of the populace of London, King George VI created her a Dame Commander of the Order of the British Empire in 1941. (She had previously been created a CBE in 1936.) Hess's lunchtime concerts influenced the formation of the City Music Society, according to the organisation's website.

Post-war career 
In 1946, Arturo Toscanini invited Hess to perform with the NBC Symphony Orchestra in New York City. According to Toscanini's biographer Mortimer Frank, after Hess and the conductor had failed to agree on tempos for Beethoven's Fifth Piano Concerto, they decided instead to perform Beethoven's Third. The 24 November 1946 broadcast concert was preserved on transcription discs and later issued on CD by Naxos Records.

Hess was most renowned for her interpretations of the works of Mozart, Beethoven and Schumann, but had a wide repertoire, ranging from Domenico Scarlatti to contemporary works. She gave the premiere of Howard Ferguson's Piano Sonata and his Piano Concerto. She also played a good amount of chamber music and performed in a piano duo with Irene Scharrer. Hess promoted public awareness of the piano duet and two-piano works of Schubert.

In 1926 and 1934 she famously arranged, for both solo piano and for two pianos the chorale Wohl mir, daß ich Jesum habe from Bach's Cantata Herz und Mund und Tat und Leben (BWV 147). This is Movement 6 of the cantata; the music is the same for Movement 10, Jesus bleibet meine Freude. Each of these movements takes its text from a verse of the hymn Jesu, meiner Seelen Wonne by Martin Janus (or Jahn). Her arrangement was published under the title Jesu, Joy of Man's Desiring, which is a rough translation of the name of this hymn, although the line does not itself appear in Bach's cantata. The chorale melody, written in 1641, is by violinist Johann Schop, not by Bach, who composed its setting.

Protégés and influence 
Her protégés included Clive Lythgoe and Richard and John Contiguglia. She also taught Stephen Kovacevich (then known as Stephen Bishop). She also has a link to jazz, having given lessons in the 1920s to Elizabeth Ivey Brubeck, mother of Dave Brubeck.

Arnold Bax's 1915 piano piece In a Vodka Shop is dedicated to her.

Last concert and retirement
In September 1961, Hess played her final public concert at London's Royal Festival Hall. She was forced to retire after suffering a stroke in early 1961 that left her with permanent brain damage. By the end of the summer of that year it became clear that her public playing days were over. She continued to teach a handful of students, notably Stephen Kovacevich, during her last years.

Death
On 25 November 1965, Hess died at the age of 75 of a heart attack in her London home. A blue plaque marks her residence at 48 Wildwood Road in Hampstead Garden Suburb, London.

Hess's Steinway piano remains at the Bishopsgate Institute and has been renamed "Myra The Steinway" in her honour.

Hess's great-nephew is the British composer Nigel Hess. He named his music publishing company Myra Music in her honour.

Chicago Dame Myra Hess Memorial Concerts
In 1977, the Chicago Cultural Center began a series of free lunchtime concerts held at its Preston Bradley Hall every Wednesday from 12:15 pm to 1:00 pm, named in Hess's honour as the Dame Myra Hess Memorial Concerts. The series is produced by Chicago's International Music Foundation. Since 1977, the concerts have been broadcast live on radio station WFMT and streamed at WFMT.com.

References

External links

 Free recordings by Myra Hess at the International Music Score Library Project (IMSLP)
International Music Foundation – The Dame Myra Hess Memorial Concerts
Rosenfelder, Ruth. "Dame Myra Hess." Jewish Women: A Comprehensive Historical Encyclopedia. 20 March 2009. Jewish Women's Archive. 5 January 2010
Myra Hess – Naxos Classical Music
video of Myra Hess performing her arrangement of "Jesu, Joy of Man's Desiring"

1890 births
1965 deaths
People from Hampstead
Alumni of the Guildhall School of Music and Drama
Alumni of the Royal Academy of Music
British women pianists
British music educators
Classical piano duos
Dames Commander of the Order of the British Empire
English Jews
English classical pianists
English women pianists
Jewish classical pianists
Musicians awarded knighthoods
People associated with the National Gallery, London
Piano pedagogues
Pupils of Tobias Matthay
Royal Philharmonic Society Gold Medallists
20th-century classical musicians
20th-century classical pianists
20th-century English musicians
Women classical pianists
20th-century English women musicians
Women music educators
20th-century women pianists